Józef Maria Hoene-Wroński (23 August 1776 – 9 August 1853) was a Polish messianist philosopher, mathematician, physicist, inventor, lawyer, occultist and economist. He was born as Hoëné to a municipal architect in 1776 but changed his name in 1815 to Józef Wroński. Later in life he changed his name to Józef Maria Hoene-Wroński, without using his family's original French spelling Hoëné. At no point in his life, neither in Polish or French, was he known as Hoëné-Wroński; nor was the common French transliteration, Josef Hoëné-Wronski, ever his official name in his native Poland (though it might have served as his chosen French nom de plume on some work).  

In 1803, Wroński joined the Marseille Observatory but was forced to leave the observatory after his theories were dismissed as grandiose rubbish. In mathematics, Wroński introduced a novel series expansion for a function in response to Joseph Louis Lagrange's use of infinite series. The coefficients in Wroński's new series form the Wronskian, a determinant Thomas Muir named in 1882.

Life
His father, Antoni Höhne (pl, de), was the municipal architect of Poznań. Antoni originally came from the small Bohemian village of Leukersdorf (present-day Čermná which is now a part of Libouchec). In later life, he settled in western Poland marrying Elżbietą Pernicką in Wolsztyn in 1773. In the same place and a few years later on, in 1776, their son Józef Maria was born. Józef was educated in Poznań and Warsaw. In 1794 he served in Poland's Kościuszko Uprising as a second lieutenant of artillery, was taken prisoner, and remained until 1797 in the Russian Army.  After resigning in the rank of lieutenant colonel in 1798, he studied in the Holy Roman Empire until 1800, when he enlisted in the Polish Legion at Marseille.  There he began his scientific and scholarly work and conceived the idea of a great philosophical system. Ten years later he moved to Paris where he would spend most of his life working unremittingly to the last in the most difficult material circumstances.

He wrote exclusively in French, in the desire that his ideas, of whose immortality he was convinced, be accessible to all; he worked, he said, "through France for Poland."   He published over a hundred works, and left many more in manuscript; at 75 years of age and nearing death, he exclaimed:  "God Almighty, there's still so much more I wanted to say!"

In science, Hoene-Wroński set himself an extraordinary task:  the complete reform of philosophy as well as that of mathematics, astronomy and  technology.  He elaborated not only a system of philosophy, but also applications to politics, history, economics, law, psychology, music and pedagogy.  It was his aspiration to reform human knowledge in an "absolute, that is, ultimate" manner.

In 1803, Wroński joined the Marseille Observatory, and began developing an enormously complex theory of the structure and origin of the universe.  During this period, he took up a correspondence with nearly all of the major scientists and mathematicians of his day, and was well respected at the observatory. In 1803 Wroński "experienced a mystical illumination, which he regarded as the discovery of the Absolute."

In 1810, he published the results of his scientific research in a massive tome, which he advocated as a new foundation for all of science and mathematics.  His theories were strongly Pythagorean, holding numbers and their properties to be the fundamental underpinning of essentially everything in the universe.  His claims were met with little acceptance, and his research and theories were generally dismissed as grandiose rubbish.  His earlier correspondence with major figures meant that his writings garnered more attention than a typical crackpot theory, even earning a review from the great mathematician Joseph Louis Lagrange (which turned out to be categorically unfavorable).  In the ensuing controversy, he was forced to leave the observatory.

He immediately turned his focus towards applying philosophy to mathematics (his critics believed that this meant dispensing with mathematical rigor in favor of generalities).  In 1812, he published a paper purporting to show that every equation has an algebraic solution, directly contradicting results which had been recently published by Paolo Ruffini; Ruffini turned out to be correct.

He later turned his attention to disparate and largely unsuccessful pursuits such as a fantastical design for caterpillar-like vehicles which he intended to replace railroad transportation, but did not manage to persuade anyone to give the design serious attention.  In 1819, he travelled to England in an attempt to obtain financial backing from the Board of Longitude to build a device to determine longitude at sea.  After initial difficulties, he was given an opportunity to address the Board, but his pretentious address, On the Longitude, contained much philosophizing and generalities, but no concrete plans for a working device, and thus failed to gain any support from the Board.  He remained for several years in England and, in 1821, published an introductory text on mathematics in London, which moderately improved his financial situation.

In 1822, he returned to France, and again took up a combination of mathematics and far-fetched ideas, despite being in poverty and scorned by intellectual society. Along with his continuing Pythagorean obsession, he spent much time working on several notoriously futile endeavors, including attempts to build a perpetual motion machine, to square the circle and to build a machine to predict the future (which he dubbed the prognometre).
In 1852, shortly before his death, he did find a willing audience for his ideas: the occultist Eliphas Levi who met Wroński and was greatly impressed and "attracted by his religious and scientific utopianism." Wroński was "a powerful catalyst" for Levi's occultism.

Wroński died in 1853 in Neuilly-sur-Seine, France, on the outskirts of Paris.

Legacy

During his lifetime nearly all his work was dismissed as nonsense. However, some of it came to be regarded in a more favourable light in later years. Although most of his inflated claims were groundless, his mathematical work contains flashes of deep insight and many important intermediary results, the most significant of which was his work on series. He had strongly criticized Lagrange for his use of infinite series, introducing instead a novel series expansion for a function.  His criticisms of Lagrange were for the most part unfounded but the coefficients in Wroński's new series proved important after his death, forming a  determinant now known as the Wronskian (the name which Thomas Muir had given them in 1882).

The level of Wroński's scientific and scholarly accomplishments and the amplitude of his objectives placed Wroński in the first rank of European metaphysicians in the early 19th century.  But the abstract formalism and obscurity of his thought, the difficulty of his language, his boundless self-assurance and his uncompromising judgments of others alienated him from most of the scientific community.  He was perhaps the most original of the Polish metaphysicians, but others were more representative of the Polish outlook.

Works

Books
 1801 - Mémoires sur l'aberration des astres mobiles, et sur l'inégalité dans l'apparence de leur mouvement, par J. Hoehné
 1803 - Philosophie critique découverte par Kant, fondée sur le dernier principe du savoir, par J. Hoehne
 1811 - Introduction à la philosophie des mathématiques, et technie de l'algorithmie, par M. Hoëné de Wronski
 1811 - Programme du cours de philosophie transcendantale, par M. Hoëné Wronski
 1812 - Résolution générale des équations de tous les degrés], par Hoëné Wronski
 1812 - Réfutation de la théorie des fonctions analytiques de Lagrange, par Hoëné Wronski
 1814 - Philosophie de l'Infini, par Hoëné Wronski
 1818 - Introduction à un ouvrage intitulé Le Sphinx, ou la Nomothétique séhélienne, par Hoëné Wronski
 1821 - A Course of mathematics, by Höené Wronski. Translated from the original French under the inspection of the author. London, 1821.
 1827 - Canons de logarithmes de H. W.
 1828 - Loi téléologique du hasard. Deuxième aperçu. Signé : Hoëné Wronski. Paris, le 13 avril 1828.
 1831 - Messianisme, union finale de la philosophie et de la religion constituant la philosophie absolue (1831-1839)<ref>[https://catalogue.bnf.fr/ark:/12148/cb316700318 Messianisme, union finale de la philosophie et de la religion constituant la philosophie absolue]. Par Hoene Wroński, d'après Francis Warrain, "L'oeuvre philosophique de Hoené Wronski". Paris : impr. de G. Doyen (impr. de J. Didot l'aîné), 1831-1839</ref>
 1831 - Prodrome du Messianisme; Révélation des destinées de l’humanité 
 1832 - Réflexions philosophiques sur un miroir parabolique 
 1833 - Loi téléologique du Hasard: réimpression de trois pièces rarissimes (1833); précédée d'une autobiographie et d'un inventaire de l'œuvre Hoëné Wronski
 1833 - Resolution of equation polynomials of tous les degries (in anglishe) 1837 - Rails mobiles, ou chemins de fer mouvans, de Hoëné Wroński
 1840 - Secret politique de Napoléon comme base de l'avenir moral du monde, par Hoëné Wronski
 1844 - Urgente réforme des Chemins de fer et de toute la locomotion terrestre, par Hoëné Wronski
 1853 - Secret politique de Napoléon, par Hoëné Wronski, comme introduction à sa récente "Philosophie de l'histoire". Nouvelle édition

Letters
 1851 - Épître à Sa Majesté l'Empereur de Russie, pour compléter les "Cent pages décisives", et pour accomplir la réforme de la mécanique céleste". Signé : Hoëné Wroński. Metz, 1851
 1851 - Épitre secrète a Son Altesse le prince Louis-Napoléon président de la République Française sur les destinées de la France

Further reading 
 Lazare Augé: Notice sur Hoené Wronski; suivi du portr. de Wronski par Mme Wronski, née s. de Montferrier de plus. acad. Paris : Libr. philos. de Ladrange, 1865
 Samuel Dickstein: Hoene Wroński : jego życie i prace (Hoene Wronski: His Life And Works), Jagiellonian University Press Cracow, 1896.
 Francis Warrain: L'œuvre philosophique de Hoené Wronski, Textes, commentaires et critique. (Three volumes), Paris, Éditions Véga, 1933, 1936, 1938.

See also
 List of Poles

References

 Władysław Tatarkiewicz, Historia filozofii (History of Philosophy), 3 vols., Warsaw, Państwowe Wydawnictwo Naukowe, 1978.

External links

 
 
 Piotr Pragacz, Notes on the life and work of Jozef Maria Hoene-Wronski, preprint (March  2007)
 J. Hoëné de Wronski, Introduction à la philosophie des mathématiques, et technie de l'algorithmie, 1811
 Roman Murawski, "The Philosophy of Hoene-Wronski" in: Organon 35, 2006, pp. 143–150

1778 births
1853 deaths
19th-century Polish mathematicians
Kościuszko insurgents
Philosophers of mathematics
People from Wolsztyn
Polish occultists
Burials at Neuilly-sur-Seine community cemetery
19th-century Polish philosophers
Polish messianism